Chapagua is a Honduran village of more than 700 inhabitants, located the banks of the Chapagua River in the department of Colón. The village is roughly halfway between Trujillo and Tocoa as one travels along the main highway.  To reach Chapagua, one exits the highway at Aguas Amarillas and travels east along the pea gravel road for about four miles.  The village consists of a grade school, a soccer field, two churches, several pulperias (micro stores), and scores of residences.

Chapagua is one of the most communities where no violence occurs, at the municipal level it is a very quiet community where there is no danger to its inhabitants, it is currently a community where it is stamped by the river Aguan that currently passes through the river Chapagua , besides the government of the republic of Honduras has forgotten to help this community, where the river year after year is eating it.

History

Chapagua was a Nahuatl settlement during the pre-Columbian period and was home to a community of English-speaking Blacks in the nineteenth century.  Hurricane Mitch devastated the community in 1998, washing away the adobe and thatch houses and killing virtually all the livestock.  The houses have since been rebuilt with concrete.  Dozens of Chapaguenses migrated to the United States in the aftermath of Mitch.  Many of the remaining residents are cattle ranchers and farmers.
Chapagua is one of the oldest communities in the entire municipality of Trujillo and the entire department of Colon. Even before the Spaniards arrived, it already existed as an indigenous community.

External links 
  (recovery after Mitch).

Populated places in Honduras